Acosta Glacier is a glacier about  long flowing north from Thurston Island just east of Dyer Point in Antarctica. It was named by the Advisory Committee on Antarctic Names (US-ACAN) after Alex V. Acosta of the United States Geological Survey (USGS) in Flagstaff, Arizona. He is a computer and graphic specialist, and was part of the USGS team that compiled the 1:5,000,000-scale Advanced Very High Resolution Radiometer satellite image maps of Antarctica and the 1:250,000-scale Landsat image maps of the Siple Coast area in the 1990s.

See also
 List of glaciers in the Antarctic
 Glaciology

References
 

Glaciers of Thurston Island